Baxter County Airport , is a county-owned public-use airport located four nautical miles (5 mi, 7 km) northwest of the central business district of Mountain Home, a city in Baxter County, Arkansas, United States. It was known as Baxter County Airport until 2005. It changed its name back to Baxter County Airport due to confusion with the close proximity of Ozark, Arkansas and Ozark, Missouri, both of which have airports. The airport used to be served by Lone Star Airlines, which operated services to Dallas-Fort Worth International in the mid-1990s.

This airport is included in the National Plan of Integrated Airport Systems for 2011–2015, which categorized it as a general aviation facility.

Although most U.S. airports use the same three-letter location identifier for the FAA and IATA, Baxter County Airport is assigned BPK by the FAA and WMH by the IATA. The airport's ICAO identifier is KBPK.

Facilities and aircraft 
The airport covers an area of 330 acres (134 ha) at an elevation of 928 feet (283 m) above mean sea level. It has one runway designated 5/23 with an asphalt surface measuring 5,001 by 75 feet (1,524 x 23 m).

For the 12-month period ending May 31, 2010, the airport had 48,900 aircraft operations, an average of 133 per day: 98% general aviation, 1% military, and 1% air taxi. At that time there were 49 aircraft based at this airport: 67% single-engine, 31% multi-engine, and 2% jet.

As of November 2015, Big Air is the onsite FBO providing fuel and services for pilots and crew. Full service 100LL and Jet-A fuel is provided. Big Air is located on the airports main ramp between Delta and Echo.

References

External links
 http://airnav.com/airport/KBPK
 Baxter County Airport, official site
 
 Aerial image as of February 2001 from USGS The National Map

Airports in Arkansas
Buildings and structures in Baxter County, Arkansas
Transportation in Baxter County, Arkansas